The Aero A.104 was a parasol monoplane light bomber and reconnaissance aircraft built in Czechoslovakia during the 1930s. It was the final derivative of the Aero A.100, and was essentially an Aero Ab.101 with an enclosed cockpit and without the lower wing. Although two different prototypes flew in 1937, it was not mass-produced.

Specifications (A.104)

See also

References

External links 
  Aero A-104

Single-engined tractor aircraft
Parasol-wing aircraft
1930s Czechoslovakian bomber aircraft
1930s Czechoslovakian military reconnaissance aircraft
A104
Aircraft first flown in 1937